Alexander Sudnitsin (born November 21, 1987) is a Russian professional ice hockey goaltender, who currently plays for HC Neftekhimik Nizhnekamsk in the Kontinental Hockey League (KHL).

Playing career
He has previously played for and joined Lokomotiv Yaroslavl after three seasons as the starting goaltender for fellow KHL outfit, HC Neftekhimik Nizhnekamsk|Neftekhimik Nizhnekamsk, on May 4, 2016.

On May 14, 2018, Sudnitsin signed as a free agent for his third KHL club, Traktor Chelyabinsk, agreeing to a two-year contract. After appearing in 24 games for Chelyabinsk in the 2018–19 season, Sudnitsin left early in his contract to sign a one-year contract with Gagarin Cup finalists, Avangard Omsk, on 4 July 2019.

In returning to Traktor Chelyabinsk for the 2020–21 season, Sudnitsin was re-assigned to play exclusively in the VHL with Chelmet Chelyabinsk, collecting 3 wins in 12 games before leaving the club on 14 February 2021, and signing his first contract abroad with Swedish top tier club, IK Oskarshamn of the Swedish Hockey League (SHL).

Sudnitsin returned to Russia for the following 2021–22 season, beginning the campaign with Izhstal Izhevsk in the VHL before returning to original KHL club, Neftekhimik Nizhnekamsk, on 18 October 2021.

References

External links

1987 births
Living people
Russian ice hockey goaltenders
Avangard Omsk players
Chelmet Chelyabinsk players
Lokomotiv Yaroslavl players
HC Neftekhimik Nizhnekamsk players
IK Oskarshamn players
Traktor Chelyabinsk players